Brian Scarlett  (11 July 1938–2 September 2004) was a British academic noted for his contributions to particle technology

Life
Scarlett was born 11 July 1938 in Biddulph, Staffordshire, England.
He attended Wolstanton Grammar School and the University of Durham, gaining a BSc in Physics in 1959. By 1964 Scarlett had earned a PhD from the same institution, having also migrated from Hatfield College to University College for his doctoral studies.
He died 2 September 2004 in Gainesville, Florida, being survived by his wife Joan, son Ian, and daughters Diane and Judy.

Career
In 1964 he joined the United Kingdom Atomic Energy Authority.  In 1966 he obtained a research assistant post at the Nottingham and District Technical College where he began his research on particle technology.  In 1969 he moved to the chemical engineering department of Loughborough University of Technology.
He stayed there until 1983 when he moved to Delft University of Technology as a full professor, of chemical technology in the Departments of chemical engineering, mechanical engineering and mining.  In 2000 he moved to the University of Florida as full professor in the National Science Foundation Engineering Research Centre, in particle science and technology, forming the largest academic group in powder mechanics in the US.  He continued there until his death.

Other activities

Politics
While at Loughborough, Scarlett served as a local councillor for Charnwood District Council and was appointed to represent Leicestershire County Council on the Trent River Authority, where he rose to the position of Chairman of Water Management.  He contemplated a full-time career in politics, but decided to stay as an academic.

Committees
Scarlett served on several committees, including as the Chairman of the ISO Committee TC/24- “Methods of Particle Sizing other than Sieving”, Chairman of the Particle Size group of the Royal Society of Chemistry, and Secretary of the Particle Technology Subject group of the Institution of Chemical Engineers. He was a member of the AIChE Particle Technology Forum and of the Working Party on Particle Characterization and Agglomeration for the European Federation of Chemical Engineering.

Quote
"A particle size measurement does not have a meaning unless the objective of the measurement is also specified.  Thus, the techniques which should be used depend entirely on the accuracy required and the circumstances of the place and time in which the measurements must be made.  There is no such thing as the “best” particle size technique unless the circumstances are also specified."

Honours and legacy
Scarlett was a Fellow of the Royal Academy of Engineering, a Fellow of the Institute of Physics, and a Fellow of the Institution of Chemical Engineers.  He was awarded honorary doctorates (DSc) by the University of Coimbra (1997) and Loughborough University (1999).
In 2000, the American Institute of Chemical Engineers gave him their Award for Lifetime Achievement in Particle Technology.
In 2006 the Fifth World Congress on Particle Technology had a Brian Scarlett Memorial Session of invited papers, with another at the Seventh in 2014.
In 2010 a Brian Scarlett Scholarship Fund was set up by the Royal Society of Chemistry to support student travel to particle technology events.

References

External links
Prof Brian Scarlett World Congress in Particle Technology 2006 Profile including many photographs
Royal Society of Chemistry Brian Scarlett Scholarship Fund

English physicists
Particle technology
People from Biddulph
Fellows of the Royal Academy of Engineering
People educated at Wolstanton Grammar School
1938 births
2004 deaths
Alumni of Hatfield College, Durham
Alumni of University College, Durham